Jason Hornick is a surgical pathologist,  Director of Surgical Pathology, and Director of the Immunohistochemistry Laboratory at Brigham and Women's Hospital. He is a Professor of Pathology at Harvard Medical School.

Hornick was a member of Heatmiser with Elliott Smith.

References

External links
 Publications by Jason Hornick, Google scholar

Year of birth missing (living people)
Living people
American pathologists
Harvard Medical School faculty
People from Boston